The third season of Teen Wolf, an American supernatural drama created by Jeff Davis and to some extent, based on the 1985 film of the same name, premiered on June 3, 2013. The series was renewed for a third season of 24 episodes on July 12, 2012.

Plot

Part 1
Jackson Whittemore (Colton Haynes) has moved to London. A new teacher, Jennifer Blake (Haley Webb), has joined Beacon Hills High school with a keen eye for Derek. While infiltrating the Alpha Pack who have taken refuge in a bank, they discover that Erica Reyes (Gage Golightly) is dead and Derek's sister Cora Hale (Adelaide Kane) is a prisoner and free them.

Scott McCall (Tyler Posey), Allison Argent (Crystal Reed), Derek Hale (Tyler Hoechlin) and the rest of the gang find themselves up against a new enemy: the lethal Alpha pack that has come to Beacon Hills, who have kidnapped Vernon Boyd (Sinqua Walls). Not only that but a mysterious, threatening, supernatural Druid has been taking categorized people as sacrifices, killing them and absorbing their power to go against the Alpha pack.

Part 2
While Scott (Tyler Posey) struggles to find his place as an Alpha, he, Allison (Crystal Reed) and Stiles (Dylan O'Brien) begin to experience strange side effects as a result of reigniting the power within Beacon Hills. Scott loses his ability to control his werewolf shift, Allison sees visions of her dead aunt, Kate, and Stiles believes he is awake while dreaming and dreaming while awake. They soon discover that the answer to their problems may be found in a new student named Kira Yukimura (Arden Cho), a girl with remarkable powers of her own.

The pack is threatened by the Nogitsune, a spirit which possesses Stiles, forcing him to complete tasks meant to cause chaos and strife, which the Nogitsune feeds off of. Scott struggles to find a way to save Stiles without killing him. They also encounter the Oni, spirits summoned by Kira's mother, Noshiko, to defeat the Nogitsune.

Cast

Main
 Tyler Posey as Scott McCall 
 Crystal Reed as Allison Argent 
 Dylan O'Brien as Stiles Stilinski 
 Tyler Hoechlin as Derek Hale 
 Holland Roden as Lydia Martin

Recurring

Episodes

Production
Season 3 was filmed in two parts. Part 1 (or Season 3A) was filmed from December 3, 2012 and wrapped up on May 5, 2013. Part 2 (Season 3B) began filming on July 29, 2013, and wrapped up on December 19, 2013. Unlike the previous two seasons, which were shot in Atlanta, Georgia, this season was shot in Los Angeles, California.

Colton Haynes left the show, taking a role on the CW series Arrow. MTV also released the first page of the first episode from season three, which is set about four months after the end of season two, and Jackson's absence was addressed within the context of the beginning of the season. On October 2, 2012 an open casting call website was set up to cast identical twins to play the identical twin alpha werewolves, Ethan and Aiden.

On November 28, 2012, Teen Wolf announced five new additions to the cast for season 3. Former Desperate Housewives stars Charlie and Max Carver have been cast as twin alpha werewolves Ethan and Aiden. They are described as being "dangerous charmers with brilliant minds". Australian actress Adelaide Kane has been cast as Cora, Derek Hale's younger sister, a mysterious and beautiful young woman toughened by a life on her own after surviving the Hale House fire. Felisha Terrell from Days of Our Lives has been cast as female alpha Kali, while Gideon Emery has been cast as Deucalion, the leader of the Alpha pack. Described as having "an eloquent, cutting intelligence", the new werewolf will set a plan in motion to turn Derek and Scott against each other, ripping the Beacon Hills supernatural community apart at the seams. Brian Patrick Wade has been cast as Ennis, an alpha werewolf who is described as a "force of pure brutality". Haley Webb has been cast as Jennifer Blake, an English teacher at Beacon Hills High School and a new love interest of Derek Hale's.

Teen Wolf announced three new recurring characters for the second half of season 3. Arden Cho has been cast as Kira, an Asian-American character who has been described as a "new student and possible threat to Beacon Hills". Her character is confirmed to be a kitsune. Doug Jones has been cast as Barrow, a mass murderer, who made his appearance in episode "Galvanize". Ryan Kelley will be the newest member of the Beacon County Sheriff's Department in Teen Wolf Season 3 Part 2, he will assist Sheriff Stilinski in uncovering the mysterious supernatural occurrences that plague the murder-prone Northern California town before becoming part of the mystery himself. Additionally, Shelley Hennig was cast, with her role being kept secret until the winter season premiere.

Linden Ashby has stated that for the second part of Season 3, "This is a season of consequence. That every action has a reaction, has a consequence. And it's not always what you think it's gonna be."

During Season 3B production, Crystal Reed decided she "wanted to explore other avenues of film and TV" and move on from the show, and her character Allison Argent was killed off in the penultimate episode.

Reception
The review aggregator website Rotten Tomatoes reported an approval rating of 88% and an average rating of 7.97/10 for the third season, based on 17 reviews. The website's critics consensus reads, "Beautifully shot and crafted, Teen Wolf delves into intellectual horror themes while staying true to the movie's original mythology."

Awards and nominations

Home media
The third season was released in two parts: 3A was released on December 10, 2013, and 3B was released on June 17, 2014.

References

2013 American television seasons
2014 American television seasons
Teen Wolf (2011 TV series)
Buddhism in fiction
Celtic mythology in popular culture
Druidry in fiction
Internment of Japanese Americans
Japanese mythology in popular culture
Television about mental health
Television shows about spirit possession
Split television seasons
Works about the Yakuza
Yōkai in popular culture
Television about the internment of Japanese Americans